Navajo Trail Raiders is a 1949 American Western film directed by R. G. Springsteen and written by M. Coates Webster. The film stars Allan Lane, Eddy Waller, Robert Emmett Keane, Barbara Bestar, Harold Landon and Dick Curtis. The film was released on October 15, 1949, by Republic Pictures.

Plot

Cast     
Allan Lane as Rocky Lane 
Black Jack as Black Jack
Eddy Waller as Nugget Clark
Robert Emmett Keane as John Blanford
Barbara Bestar as Judy Clark
Harold Landon as Tom Stanley 
Dick Curtis as Henchman Brad
Dennis Moore as Frank Stanley
Ted Adams as Sheriff Robbins
Forrest Taylor as Sam Brynes
Marshall Reed as Henchman Jed
Steve Clark as Larkin

References

External links 
 

1949 films
American Western (genre) films
1949 Western (genre) films
Republic Pictures films
Films directed by R. G. Springsteen
American black-and-white films
1940s English-language films
1940s American films